Philip of Orléans (1 July 1336 – 1 September 1375) was a Duke of Orléans, Touraine, and Count of Valois, the fifth son of King Philip VI of France and his wife Joan the Lame.

His father named him Duke of Orléans, a newly created duchy, in 1344.

Marriage and Issue
On 8 January 1345, Philip married his second-cousin, Blanche of France (1 April 1328 – 1392), the daughter of King Charles IV of France and Joan of Évreux, but they had no children.

Philip had two natural sons, and one of them was Louis d'Orléans who became Bishop of Poitiers and Bishop of Beauvais. He also had a natural daughter Marie d'Orléans who married Gédéon V of Beauvilliers.

As a consequence of the Treaty of Brétigny, he served some time as a hostage in England for the good behavior of his brother King John II of France, when he was temporarily released.

The Duke of Orléans died in 1375 without any legitimate issue. His title and lands returned to the royal domain of France.

Ancestry

References

1336 births
1376 deaths
People from Vincennes
House of Valois
Dukes of Orléans
Valois, Philip of
Counts of Valois
14th-century peers of France
Sons of kings